Lebanese Australians refers to citizens or permanent residents of Australia of Lebanese ancestry. The population is diverse, having a large Christian religious base, being mostly Maronite Catholics, while also having a large Muslim group of Sunni branch of Islam.

Lebanon, in both its modern-day form as the Lebanese state (declared 1920; independent 1943), and its historical form as the region of the Lebanon, has been a source of migrants to Australia since the 1870s. 248,430 Australians (about 1% of the total population) claimed some Lebanese ancestry in 2021. The 2021 census reported 87,343 Lebanese-born people in Australia, with nearly 66,000 of those resident in Greater Sydney.

The term Leb or Lebo, is (sometimes derogatorily) used to refer to people of Lebanese descent, or more broadly, anyone of Middle Eastern appearance, especially in the Sydney area.

Diaspora history

19th-century migration
As part of a large scale emigration in the 1870s, numerous Lebanese (specifically Lebanese Christians fleeing Ottoman persecution) migrated in great numbers out of Lebanon to various destinations. Most emigrated to The United Kingdom, Brazil, Argentina and other Latin American nations, particularly Venezuela, Colombia, and Ecuador. Many also went to the United States, Canada and others to Australia, primarily to the eastern states, and most to New South Wales in particular.

In the 1890s, there were increasing numbers of Lebanese immigrants to Australia, part of the mass emigration from the area of the Lebanon that would become the modern Lebanese state, and also from the Anti-Lebanon Mountains region of what would become Syria.

White Australia policy
Under the White Australia policy of the late nineteenth century (and with Lebanon being located in the Middle East, geographically known as South West Asia) Lebanese migrants were classified as Asians and came within the scope of the so-called White Australia policy, which intentionally restricted non-white immigration to Australia. Lebanese migrants, like others deemed non-white by various colony laws from 1875–1888, were excluded from citizenship, the right to vote and employment, and were treated as enemy aliens during World War I and World War II. In 1897 Lebanese store keepers and businesses were accused of fraud by state border Customs officers during Queensland customs prosecution cases.

Prior to 1918, Lebanese immigrants to Australia were not habitually distinguished from Turks because the area of modern Lebanon was a province of the Turkish Ottoman Empire. Administration then passed to the French Mandate for several decades, which ruled it together with what would become Syria, its neighbour. Hence, for that period, the Lebanese were not distinguished from Syrians. 

From 1920, people from Lebanon (and Syria) were granted access to Australian citizenship as the Nationality Act 1920 removed the racial disqualification from the naturalisation laws.

By 1947, there were 2,000 Lebanese-born in Australia, almost all Christian.

Second wave of migration
The Lebanese-born population numbered 5,000 in 1971. Following the outbreak of the Lebanese Civil War in 1975–1990, this wave of migrants were often poor and for the first time, over half of them were Muslim. This influx of new migrants changed the character of the established Lebanese community in Australia significantly, especially in Sydney where 70% of the Lebanese-born population were concentrated.

Christian Maronite and Orthodox Lebanese Christians that settled in Australia over the last two centuries were able to gain some influence within Australian politics. In late 1975, unrest in Lebanon caused a group of influential Maronite Australians to approach Australian Prime Minister Malcolm Fraser and his immigration minister, Michael MacKellar regarding the resettling of Lebanese civilians with their Australian relatives. Immediate access to Australia could not be granted under normal immigration categories, thus the Lebanese people were categorised as refugees. This was not in the traditional sense as the Lebanese people were not fleeing from persecution but escaping from internal conflict between Muslim and Christian groups. This action was known as the "Lebanon Concession".

Between 1975–1990, more than 30,000 civil war refugees arrived in Australia. Most immigrants were Muslim Lebanese from deprived rural areas who learned of Australia's Lebanon Concession and decided to seek a better life. They were Muslims from northern Lebanon as Christian and Muslim Lebanese were unwilling to leave the capital city, Beirut. Immigrants of the Lebanese Concession primarily settled in south-west Sydney; Sunnis in Lakemba and Shias in Arncliffe.

21st century
Following the trials for a series of gang rape attacks in Sydney in 2000 by a group of Lebanese Muslims, the Lebanese Muslim Australian community came under significant scrutiny by the tabloid media and "Shock jocks", in addition to a more general anti-Muslim backlash after the 11 September attacks in 2001. Community concern and divisiveness continued in the wake of the 2005 Cronulla riots in Sydney, in which an altercation between some youths of Middle Eastern appearance and local surf livesavers blew up into a full-blown racially-motivated riot the following weekend, helped along by tabloid journalism and shock jocks.

In November 2016, Immigration Minister, Peter Dutton said that it was a mistake of a previous Liberal administration to have brought out Lebanese Muslim immigrants. Foreign Minister, Julie Bishop said Dutton was making a specific point about those charged with terrorism offences, but Dutton was criticised for his comments in the media by politicians, terrorism experts and others.

Return migration
Lebanese Australians have a moderate rate of return migration to Lebanon. In December 2001, the Department of Foreign Affairs estimated that there were 30,000 Australian citizen residents in Lebanon. During the 2006 Israel-Lebanon conflict, the Australian Government organised mass evacuations of Australian residents in Lebanon.

Demographics
Worldwide, most people of Lebanese ancestry today live outside Lebanon, and are known as the Lebanese diaspora which numbers from 8 to possibly 14 million.

Locations
In New South Wales, most Lebanese Australians were reported to reside in the Western Sydney council areas of City of Bankstown, with City of Holroyd, City of Canterbury and City of Parramatta (all pre-2016 council areas). The area included suburbs such as Lakemba, Greenacre and Punchbowl.

In Victoria, like most Middle-Easterners, Lebanese Australians are mostly found in the Northern Melbourne council areas such as the City of Moreland and the City of Hume, particularly in neighbourhoods such as Broadmeadows, Coburg and Altona North.

Religious diversity
All main Lebanese religious groups – Christians, including Maronites, Melkites, Greek Orthodox, Protestants, Muslims (Shia and Sunnis) and Druze were represented in Australia in 2006.

Business
Lebanese in Sydney have followed a distinctive occupational pattern characterised by high levels of self-employment, particularly in petty commercial activities such as hawking and shopkeeping. In 1901, '80 per cent of Lebanese in NSW were concentrated in commercial occupations' – in 1947, little had changed, as 60 per cent of Lebanese were 'either employers or self-employed'. Even in the 1991 census, Lebanese men and women were 'noticeably over-represented as self-employed'. The Lebanese in Melbourne have opened restaurants and groceries and Middle Eastern shops and Lebanese bars on Sydney Road which is sometimes called "Little Lebanon".

The peak business body is the Australian Lebanese Chamber of Commerce, with associations in both Sydney and Melbourne.

Arts, culture, terminology
In 2014, a series of documentaries on Lebanese Australians was presented by SBS under the title Once Upon a Time in Punchbowl.

The Lebanese Film Festival was launched in Sydney in 2012. Every year since then, it has showcases films which are either filmed or based in Lebanon, or made by Lebanese film makers throughout the world. The organisation is based in Bankstown, but the film festival travels to cinemas in Newcastle and Bowral in NSW, as well as Adelaide, Canberra, Melbourne and Brisbane from August to November each year.

In 2017–8, two seasons of the sitcom Here Come the Habibs, featuring a Lebanese Australian family who win the lottery and move to the posh eastern suburbs of Sydney, aired on Channel 9.

Michael Mohammed Ahmad's 2018 comic novel The Lebs was shortlisted for the 2019 Miles Franklin Award. He had previously written an essay entitled "Lebs and Punchbowl Prison", the prison referring to his alma mater, Punchbowl Boys' High School. At his school, the term "Lebs" did not refer just to boys from Lebanese family, but to anyone whose family came from the Middle East, and even included boys with African and Indonesian backgrounds. The term "Leb" or "Lebo" has been used as a derogatory term, mostly in Sydney, and gained more widespread use after the 2005 Cronulla Riots. It is listed in the Collins English Dictionary as "Australian (offensive, slang), a person from Lebanon or of Lebanese origin". Ahmad wishes to help reclaim the word through his writing.

Notable Lebanese Australians

See also

 List of Lebanese people in Australia
 Arab Australians
 Assyrian Australians
 Egyptian Australians
 Syrian Australians 
 Jewish Australians 
 Maltese Australians

References

Further reading

 Australian Lebanese Historical Society
 Lebanese-Australian Embassy
 United Australian Lebanese movement
 World Lebanese Cultural Union (WLCU) Geographic-Regional Council (GRC) for Australia and New Zealand 
  (History of Lebanese in Sydney)

 
 
Australia